"Remember" is a song by American heavy metal band Disturbed. It was released on December 3, 2002, as the second single from their studio album Believe. Vocalist David Draiman stated that "Remember" is his favorite from the first two Disturbed albums.

On their 2009 Music as a Weapon IV tour, this song was performed on acoustic guitar, with only vocals and guitar for most of the song.

Music video 
Two music videos were made: the first features a live playing of the song by the band and another features the band playing on a small stage with a set of screens behind them, showing words and clips that reflect on the song.

Track listing

CD 1 
 "Remember" – 4:07
 "Remember"  – 4:22
 "Rise"  – 4:10

CD 2 
 "Remember" – 4:07
 "Bound"  – 3:58
 "Mistress"  – 3:51

7" vinyl 
 "Remember" – 4:07
 "Remember"  – 4:22

Japanese import 
 "Remember" – 4:10
 "Remember"  – 4:24
 "Rise"  – 4:09
 "Bound"  – 3:53

European promo 
 "Remember"  – 4:07

Personnel 
 David Draiman – vocals
 Dan Donegan – guitars, electronics
 Steve "Fuzz" Kmak – bass
 Mike Wengren – drums

Chart positions

References 

2002 singles
Disturbed (band) songs
Songs written by Dan Donegan
Songs written by David Draiman
Songs written by Mike Wengren
2002 songs
Reprise Records singles
Song recordings produced by Johnny K